Black Book is a 2006 war drama thriller film co-written and directed by Paul Verhoeven, and starring Carice van Houten, Sebastian Koch, Thom Hoffman and Halina Reijn. The film, credited as based on several true events and characters, is about a young Jewish woman in the Netherlands who becomes a spy for the resistance during World War II after tragedy befalls her in an encounter with the Nazis. The film had its world premiere on 1 September 2006 at the Venice Film Festival and its public release on 14 September 2006 in the Netherlands. It is the first film that Verhoeven made in the Netherlands since The Fourth Man, made in 1983 before he moved to the United States.

The press in the Netherlands was positive; with three Golden Calves, Black Book won the most awards at the Netherlands Film Festival in 2006. The international press responded positively, as well, especially to the performance of Van Houten. It was nominated for the BAFTA Award for Best Film Not in the English Language, and was the Dutch submission for the Academy Award for Best Foreign Language Film in 2007, but was not nominated.

It was three times more expensive than any Dutch film ever made, and also the Netherlands' most commercially successful, with the country's highest box-office gross of 2006. In 2008, the Dutch public voted it the best Dutch film ever.

Plot
In 1944, Dutch-Jewish singer Rachel Stein is hiding from the Nazi regime in the occupied Netherlands. When the farmhouse where she has been hiding is destroyed by an Allied bomber, she goes to see a lawyer named Smaal, who has been helping her family. He arranges for her to escape to the liberated southern part of the country. Aided by a man named Van Gein, Rachel is reunited with her family and boards a boat that is to take them and other refugees to the south. However, they are ambushed on the river by members of the German SS, who kill them and rob the bodies of valuables. Rachel alone survives, but does not manage to escape from occupied territory.

Using a non-Jewish alias, Ellis de Vries, Rachel becomes involved with a Dutch resistance group in the Hague, under the leadership of Gerben Kuipers and working closely with a doctor, Hans Akkermans. Smaal is in touch with this Resistance cell. When Kuipers's son and other members of the Resistance are captured, Ellis agrees to help by seducing local SD commander Hauptsturmführer Ludwig Müntze. At a party at the local SD headquarters, Ellis recognises Obersturmführer Günther Franken, Müntze's brutal deputy, as the officer who had overseen the massacre of refugees on the boat. She obtains a job as a secretary at the SD headquarters while also falling in love with Müntze who, in contrast to Franken, is not abusive or sadistic. He realises that she is a Jew, but does not care.

Thanks to a hidden microphone that Ellis plants in Franken's office, the Resistance realises that Van Gein is the traitor who betrayed Rachel, her family, and the other Jews to the SS. Against Kuipers's orders, Akkermans decides to abduct Van Gein to expose him. Their attempt goes wrong, and Van Gein is killed. Franken responds by planning to kill 40 hostages, including most of the plotters, but Müntze, who realises the war is lost and has been negotiating with the Resistance, countermands the order.

Müntze forces Ellis to tell him her story. On her evidence, he confronts Franken with a superior officer, Obergruppenführer Käutner, who orders Franken to open his safe, expecting to find the valuables stolen from the Jews he had killed, this being a capital offence. However, the safe contains no valuables, and Franken then tells Käutner that Müntze has been negotiating with Dutch resistance "terrorists" for a truce. Müntze is imprisoned and condemned to death. The Resistance plots to rescue their imprisoned members; Ellis agrees to cooperate only on the condition that they also free Müntze. The plan is betrayed, and the would-be rescuers find the prisoners' cells filled with German troops. Only Akkermans and one other man manage to flee.

Ellis is subsequently arrested and taken to Franken's office. He knows about her and the bug and, knowing that the Resistance is listening in, he stages a confrontation to make them believe that Ellis is the Nazi collaborator, responsible for the failure of the rescue. Kuipers and his companions swear to make her pay for her treason. Ronnie, a Dutch woman working at the SD headquarters to whom Ellis had confided her role in the Resistance, helps her and Müntze escape.

When the country is liberated by the Allies, Franken attempts to escape by boat, but is killed by Akkermans, who takes the Jewish loot. Suspecting Smaal is the traitor, Müntze and Ellis return to confront him. Smaal states that the identity of the traitor is evidenced by his 'black book', in which he had detailed all his dealings with Jews. However, he refuses to discuss further, wanting to go to the Canadian authorities. When they are about to leave, Smaal and his wife are killed by an unknown assailant. Müntze chases him into the street, only to be recognised by the Dutch crowd and arrested by soldiers from the Canadian Army. The Dutch also recognise Ellis and arrest her as a collaborator, but not before she grabs the black book.

Müntze is brought before the ranking Canadian officers and finds that Käutner is helping to keep order among the defeated German forces. Käutner convinces a Canadian colonel that under military law, the defeated German military retains the right to punish its own soldiers. Due to the previously issued death warrant, Müntze is executed by a firing squad.

Ellis is imprisoned with other accused collaborators, and humiliated and tortured by the violently anti-Nazi volunteer jailers, but rescued by Akkermans, who is now a colonel in the Dutch Army. Akkermans brings her to his medical office, and says that he killed Franken when the Nazi tried to escape. He shows her the valuables stolen from Jewish victims. When informed about Müntze's fate, Ellis goes into shock, and Akkermans administers a tranquilliser which is in fact an overdose of insulin. Ellis, feeling dizzy, sees the bottle of insulin and survives by quickly eating a bar of chocolate. She realises then that Akkermans is the traitor who had collaborated with Franken and had killed the Smaals. While Akkermans is distracted, waving to a crowd that cheers him, she jumps from the balcony into the crowd below, and runs away. He tries to follow, but is blocked by the crowd.

Ellis proves her innocence to Canadian military intelligence and to the former Resistance leader Gerben Kuipers by means of Smaal's black book, which lists how many Jews had been taken to Akkermans for medical help just prior to their murders. Together, Ellis and Kuipers intercept the fleeing Akkermans, who is hiding in a coffin in a hearse with the stolen money, gold, and jewels. They kill the driver, and while Kuipers drives the hearse, Ellis screws down the coffin's secret air vents. They drive to Hollands Diep where the original SS trap had been sprung, and wait until Akkermans suffocates. Ellis and Kuipers wonder what to do with the stolen money and jewels.

The scene changes to Israel in 1956, reprising the opening scenes, and shows Rachel meeting her husband and their two children, and walking back into Kibbutz Stein, with a sign at the gate announcing that it was funded with recovered money from Jews killed during the war. In the final scene, the tranquility of Rachel and her family is interrupted by explosions heard in the distance; the siren announces an air attack and Israeli soldiers position themselves at the front of the kibbutz.

Cast

Production

Writing

After 20 years of filmmaking in the United States, Verhoeven returned to his homeland, the Netherlands, for the making of Black Book. The story was written by Verhoeven and screenwriter Gerard Soeteman, with whom he made successful films such as Turkish Delight (1973) and Soldier of Orange (1977). The two men had been working on the script for fifteen years, but they solved their story problems in the early 2000s by changing the main character from male to female. According to Verhoeven, Black Book was born out of elements that did not fit in any of his earlier movies, and it can be seen as a supplement to his earlier film about World War II Soldier of Orange.

Verhoeven has emphasised that the story does not show an obvious moral contrast between characters, for a theme of moral relativism:

Black Book is not a true story, unlike Soldier of Orange, but Verhoeven states that many of the events are true. As in the film, the German headquarters were in the Hague. In 1944 many Jews that tried to cross to liberated parts of the southern Netherlands were entrapped by Dutch policemen. As in the film, crossing attempts took place in the Biesbosch. Events are related to the life of Verhoeven, who was born in 1938 and grew up in the Hague during the Second World War. The execution of Müntze by German firing squad after the war had ended echoes the notorious May 1945 German deserter execution incident.

Financing
The initial estimate of the budget for making Black Book was €12,000,000. According to film producer Rob Houwer, who worked with Paul Verhoeven on previous films, it was not possible to get the job done for that amount of money. San Fu Maltha produced the film together with three other producers. He tried to economize on different parts such as the scenes in Israel, that could have been left out without changing the plot, but this was not negotiable for Paul Verhoeven. 

Because of financing problems, the filming did not start as planned in 2004 but was delayed until August 2005. In this month it was announced that Black Book received about €2,000,000 support from the Netherlands Public Broadcasting, the CoBO Fund, and the Dutch Ministry of Education, Culture and Science. There were also several foreign investors, which made the film a Belgian, British, and German coproduction. With a final estimated budget of €18,000,000 the film was the most expensive Dutch film ever, at the time of its release.

In October 2006 twelve crew members and businessmen started a lawsuit in which they demanded the bankruptcy of Zwartboek Productie B.V., the legal entity founded for the film. Some of them had already been waiting for more than a year to get their money, in total tens of thousands of euros. Production company Fu Works settled the case and promised to pay the creditors.

Filming

The shooting of the film was delayed in 2004 due to financial problems and Paul Verhoeven's health problems. Because of the delay there was a lawsuit regarding lead actress Carice van Houten, who had agreed to act in a play. When van Houten was forced to return to the set, the theater company sued over the costly delay to their own production. The outcome of the lawsuit was that the production company had to pay €60,000 for her unavailability.

Principal photography took place from 24 August until 19 December 2005 on locations in the Netherlands, including Hardenberg, Giethoorn, the Hague, Delft and Dordrecht, and in Israel, by Hocus Focus Films. In the opening scene a real pre-war farm was blown up in the municipality of Hardenberg. The farm had already been declared uninhabitable and ready to be demolished. Some underwater explosions were filmed in a lake near Giethoorn. In the centre of The Hague they built bunkers to cover up modern day objects such as the entrance to an underground car park. The former chemistry faculty building of the Delft University of Technology was used to film prison scenes. Great attention to detail was paid in the film. Several stage props were reproduced from the 1940s, such as signs, posters and the black book itself. Furthermore, in one of the liberation scenes in The Hague, up to 1,200 extras appeared.

During shooting, the general public were able to see "making of" scenes on their mobile phones and on the internet.

Historic background
The story of the Jewish woman Rachel Stein in Zwartboek is based on Dutch resistant fighter Esmée van Eeghen. Van Gein was based on the lives of Ans van Dijk and Andries Riphagen.
Notary Smaal is based on the unsolved murder of 65-year-old lawyer H. de Boer in The Hague on 30 May 1945 (shortly after the liberation). During the war, de Boer appeared to have maintained good contacts with the German Sicherheitsdienst.

Media based on the film

Novelisation

The screenplay by Paul Verhoeven and Gerard Soeteman was turned into a thriller novel by Dutch writer Laurens Abbink Spaink. The book was published in September 2006 by Uitgeverij Podium and contains photos and an afterword by Verhoeven and Soeteman. Spaink says about the book: "Black Book is a literary thriller. Its form is in between the typical American novelisation, only describing what the camera sees, and a literary novel. The novelisation adds something to the film. It gave Rachel Stein a past, memories and a house. In the film she did not have a personal space."

Soundtrack

The soundtrack was released on 2 October 2006 by Milan Records. The album contains four 1930s–1940s songs sung by Carice van Houten as she performed them as Rachel Stein in the film. Three are in German, one in English. The other tracks are written by Anne Dudley. The album was recorded in London and produced by Roger Dudley.

Reception
The review aggregator Rotten Tomatoes reports a 75% "fresh" rating based on 155 reviews, with an average score of 7.06/10; the general consensus states: "A furious mix of sex, violence, and moral relativism, Black Book is shamelessly entertaining melodrama.". Metacritic reported the film had an average score of 71 out of 100, based on 34 reviews.

Premieres and festivals

Black Book had its world premiere on 1 September 2006 in Venice, as part of the official selection of the Venice International Film Festival. Here it was nominated for a Golden Lion and won the Young Cinema Award for best international film. The film was also in the official selection of the 2006 Toronto Film Festival.

The Prince of Orange and his wife Princess Máxima attended the Dutch gala premiere of Black Book in the Hague on 12 September 2006. Other prominent guests at the premiere were mayor Wim Deetman, minister Hans Hoogervorst, minister Karla Peijs and state secretary Medy van der Laan.

The film was nominated for four Golden Calves at the Netherlands Film Festival in 2006. It won in three categories: the Golden Calf for Best Actress (Carice van Houten), for Best Director (Paul Verhoeven), and for Best Film (San Fu Maltha). Black Book was the most awarded film of the 2006 festival.

The United States premiere of Black Book was a gala screening at Palm Springs High School on 5 January 2007 during the Palm Springs International Film Festival. On 2 March 2007, Black Book was the opening film of the Miami International Film Festival.

The German premiere of Black Book was a gala screening at Zoo Palast in Berlin on 9 May 2007.

Critical reception
Most of the Dutch press were positive about the film. Dana Linsen writes in NRC Handelsblad: "In Black Book, Verhoeven does not focus on moral discourse but rather on human measure, and with the non-cynical approach of his female lead and of love he has given new colour to his work." Belinda van de Graaf in Trouw writes: "Breathless we run along burning farms, ugly resistance fighters, pretty kraut whores, spies, traitors, and because the story has to go on the coincidences pile up until it makes you laugh. When Carice van Houten screams 'Will it never stop, then!' it is almost kitsch, and not surprisingly already a classic film quote." She compares this film to Soldier of Orange and explains why this film is not a stereotypical war film: "The war adventure is no longer based on the male character of the type Rutger Hauer, with his machismo and testosterone, but the small fighter Carice van Houten". Literary critic Jessica Durlacher, daughter of an Auschwitz survivor, describes the film in Vrij Nederland with the following comparison: "The reality of 1940–1945 as portrayed in Black Book compared to reality is like the Eiffel Tower in Las Vegas compared to the original in Paris."

The international press wrote positively about the film and specifically about van Houten. According to Jason Solomons in The Observer: "Black Book is great fun, an old-fashioned war movie in parts, but with deep undercurrents about fugitive Jews, the Resistance, collaborators and the messy politics of war. This being Verhoeven, there's lots of sex and a scene in which the extremely attractive star (Carice van Houten) bleaches her pubic hair. That aside, hers is a star-making performance, putting even Scarlett [Johansson] in the shade." In the Frankfurter Allgemeine Zeitung Dirk Schümer says Carice van Houten is not only more beautiful, but also a better actress than Scarlett Johansson. Furthermore, he writes in his review: "Europe's Hollywood can actually be better than the original. With his basic instinct sharpened in California, Verhoeven demonstrates here the cinema as a medium of individual tragedy." Jacques Mandelbaum writes in his review in Le Monde: "This lesson about humanity and about fear can be situated in the wake of several rare masterpieces, that are solemnly confronted by this story"; he also compares Black Book with classics like The Great Dictator, To Be or Not to Be, and Monsieur Klein.

Richard Schickel of Time named the film one of the Top 10 Movies of 2007, ranking it at #5, calling it a "dark, richly mounted film". While Schickel saw the film as possibly "old-fashioned stylistically, and rather manipulative in its plotting", he also saw "something deeply satisfying in the way it works out the fates of its troubled, yet believable characters."

Commercial success
Before the film was released, the rights for distribution had been sold to distributors in 52 countries. According to the production company Fu Works these sales made the film Black Book commercially the most successful Dutch film production ever, at the time of its release.

Black Book received a Golden Film (100,000 tickets sold) within a record breaking three days and a Platinum Film (400,000 tickets sold) within three weeks after the Dutch premiere. The film had its millionth visitor on 12 January 2007 and was the first film to receive a Diamond Film award.

Black Book had the highest box office gross for a Dutch film in 2006, coming third overall in 2006 in the Netherlands, after the American films Pirates of the Caribbean: Dead Man's Chest and The Da Vinci Code. As of 31 December 2006, the box office gross in the Netherlands was €6,953,118.

Top ten lists
The film appeared on several critics' top ten lists of the best films of 2007.
 1st – Jonathan Rosenbaum, Film Comment
 3rd – James Coleman, The 213
 5th – James Berardinelli, ReelViews
 5th – Richard Schickel, Time
 8th – Nathan Lee, The Village Voice
 9th – Scott Tobias, The A.V. Club

List of nominations and awards
 Nomination Golden Lion (2006)
 Young Cinema Award for Best International Film (2006)
 Golden Film for 100,000 visitors in the Netherlands (2006)
 Platinum Film for 400,000 visitors in the Netherlands (2006)
 Golden Onion for Worst Actor (2006) for Johnny de Mol
 Nomination Golden Calf for Best Supporting Actress (2006) for Halina Reijn
 Golden Calf for Best Actress (2006) for Carice van Houten
 Golden Calf for Best Director (2006) for Paul Verhoeven
 Golden Calf for Best Film (2006) for San Fu Maltha
 Nomination London Film Critics' Circle Award for Foreign Language Film of the Year (2006)
 The Hague Public Award 2006 for contributing to a positive image of The Hague
 Nomination British Academy Film Award for Best Film Not in the English Language (2007)
 Dutch submission for the Academy Award nomination for Best Foreign Language Film (2007); was on the shortlist, but not among the five nominees
 Diamond Film for 1,000,000 visitors in the Netherlands (2007)
 Nomination Saturn Award for Best Actress for Carice van Houten (2008)
 Nomination Saturn Award for Best International Film (2008)

See also 
Lust, Caution

References

External links

  
 
 
 
 
 
 

2006 films
2000s spy thriller films
German spy thriller films
British spy thriller films
Belgian spy thriller films
Canadian Armed Forces in films
2000s Dutch-language films
2000s German-language films
2000s English-language films
Hebrew-language films
Films directed by Paul Verhoeven
Films set in 1944
Films set in 1956
Films set in Israel
Films set in the Netherlands
Films shot in Germany
Films shot in Israel
Films shot in London
Films shot in the Netherlands
Western Front of World War II films
World War II films based on actual events
Babelsberg Studio films
World War II spy films
Spy films based on actual events
Films scored by Anne Dudley
British World War II films
German World War II films
Dutch World War II films
Sony Pictures Classics films
2006 multilingual films
Dutch multilingual films
German multilingual films
British multilingual films
Belgian multilingual films
2000s British films
2000s German films
Films about Dutch resistance